Dale Norman Anderson (March 5, 1932 – December 6, 2015) was a Canadian ice hockey defenceman. He played 13 games for the Detroit Red Wings of the National Hockey League in the 1956–57 season. The rest of his career, which lasted from 1952 to 1968, was spent in the minor leagues.

Anderson also played professional hockey with the Vancouver Canucks, Saskatoon Quakers, and Portland Buckaroos of the Western Hockey League, the Montreal Royals of the Quebec Hockey League as well as the Springfield Indians of the American Hockey League.

Anderson worked for Seagrams Distillery in Saskatoon after hockey and died on December 6, 2015 at the age of 83 at St. Paul's Hospital in Saskatoon, Saskatchewan.

Career statistics

Regular season and playoffs

References

External links
 

1932 births
2015 deaths
Canadian ice hockey defencemen
Detroit Red Wings players
Ice hockey people from Saskatchewan
Portland Buckaroos players
Saskatoon Quakers players
Sportspeople from Regina, Saskatchewan
Springfield Indians players
Vancouver Canucks (WHL) players
Western International Hockey League players